Carhess Creek is a river in Greater Sudbury and Sudbury District in Northeastern Ontario, Canada. It is in the Great Lakes Basin and is a right tributary of the Onaping River. The name is a portmanteau of the names of two geographic townships through which it flows, Hess Township and Cartier Township.

The creek begins at Ferguson Lake in geographic Hess Township, Sudbury District, and flows south through Green Lake into geographic Cartier Township. It turns east, takes in the left tributary Depot Creek, passes into the northwest corner of geographic Levack Township, Greater Sudbury, flows over a series of rapids, heads around both sides of a small hill, and reaches its mouth at the Onaping River, upstream of the community of Levack. The Onaping River flows via the Vermilion River and the Spanish River to Lake Huron.

Tributaries
Depot Creek (left)

References

Sources

See also
List of rivers of Ontario

Rivers of Sudbury District
Rivers of Greater Sudbury